Vincent Eugene Falter  (born 20 December 1932) is a retired major general in the United States Army. He served as Commanding General of the United States Army Military Personnel Center. He enlisted in the Army in May 1953 and was commissioned in May 1954 after graduating from Field Artillery Officer Candidate School. He later completed a B.Ed. degree in military science at the University of Nebraska Omaha in 1963 and earned a M.P.A. degree from Shippensburg State College.

References

1932 births
Living people
People from Akron, Ohio
Military personnel from Ohio
University of Nebraska Omaha alumni
United States Army personnel of the Vietnam War
Recipients of the Air Medal
Shippensburg University of Pennsylvania alumni
Recipients of the Legion of Merit
United States Army generals
Recipients of the Distinguished Service Medal (US Army)
Recipients of the Defense Distinguished Service Medal